June Banks (born 4 March 1969) is an English snooker player. She was runner-up in the 2008 World Women's Snooker Championship,

Biography
Banks played in the 1987 World Women's Snooker Championship, reaching the quarter final, where she was beaten by Mandy Fisher.

From 1995 to 2002, Banks was beaten in five tournament finals by Kelly Fisher. Banks' first notable tournament victory came in 2005, when she beat Reanne Evans to become British Ladies Snooker Champion. Since then she has reached several other finals, and won the World Ladies Senior championship (for players aged 40 and over) for three consecutive years, 2009–2011.

She was runner-up in the 2008 World Women's Snooker Championship, losing 2–5 to the dominant player of the era, defending champion Reanne Evans. Evans won the title each year from 2005 to 2014, and also in 2016 and 2019.

Banks practices at the Sidcup Snooker Club.

Titles and achievements

References

English snooker players
Living people
Female snooker players
1969 births